The 2006 South American Under-20 Women's Football Championship was the second edition of South American youth women's football championship and the first with an age limit of 20 years. It was held from 4 to 20 January 2006 in Viña del Mar and Valparaíso, Chile. Team Brazil won this tournament and along with team Argentina, qualified for the 2006 FIFA U-20 Women's World Championship.

First round

Group A

Group B

Final round

References

2006
Women
International association football competitions hosted by Chile
2006 in women's association football
2006 in Chilean football
2006 in youth association football
Youth sport in Chile